HB Ice Cream (originally an initialisation of both Hughes Brothers and Hazelbrook Farm) is an ice cream brand in Ireland and is part of the Unilever Group's Heartbrand ice cream brand.

It manufactures most of the Heartbrand's ice cream range, as well as some products designed exclusively for the Irish market, including the Hazelbrook Farm range of blocks of ice-cream.

In Northern Ireland, both HB and Wall's ice-cream (the UK variant of the Heartbrand) are available, and in recent years have been promoted together as HB Wall's.

History
The company was founded in 1926 as Hughes Brothers by James, George, and William Hughes at Hazelbrook Farm in Churchtown, Dublin. The name Hazelbrook Farm was dropped during World War II but brought back in the late 1980s except that it was called "HB Originals" from 2002 to 2005. In 1964, the milk distribution operations of HB were transferred to Premier Dairies. The rest of the company was sold to W. R. Grace and Company and subsequently became part of Unilever in 1973. HB also made sweets and chocolate too at phases. In 2002 and 2003 it made frozen yogurt.

In 2003, the HB Ice Cream plant in Churchtown was closed with the loss of 180 jobs.

Hazelbrook House, the Hughes family farmhouse, was moved to Bunratty Folk Park in 2001, where it is now on display and open to the public.

Advertising
In 2016 the brand celebrated its 90th birthday, and all television adverts since 1961 for HB returned to television screens. During the late 1970s and early 1980s popular phrases included "Two Letters Spell Ireland's Favourite Ice Cream", "Still The Favourite" during the mid-1980s while some adverts were used for Wall's in England, Miko in France and other sister brands. During the mid 1990s there were Cool Bits lolly pop like a sweet. On 26 April 2017 many of the adverts from the 1960s and 1970s were made available to the Irish Film Archive and can be watched online.

See also
 Golly Bar
 Choc Ice
 Heartbrand
 List of ice cream brands
 Unilever
 Wibbly Wobbly Wonder

References
 Tears and Smiles as the HB Factory Close, Rathfarnham Community Website
 See "The Story of HB" "80 years of Ireland's favourite Ice Cream" by Paul Mulhern and Kieran Fagan. First Published by Unilever Ireland, 20 Riverwalk, National Digital Park, Citywest Business Campus, Dublin 24. Copyright Paul Mulhern and Kieran Fagan 2006.

External links
 HB Ice Cream
 Unilever Ireland
 Lakeland Dairies

Unilever brands
Companies of the Republic of Ireland
Ice cream brands
Food and drink companies established in 1926
1926 establishments in Ireland

sv:Heartbrand#Övriga företag